Khushhal Khan Khattak Express is a passenger train operated daily by Pakistan Railways between Karachi and Peshawar. The train named after Khushhal Khan Khattak, a Pashtun nationalist and poet, warrior, scholar, and chief of the Khattak tribe.

Route
 Karachi Cantonment–Kotri Junction via Karachi–Peshawar Railway Line
 Kotri Junction–Attock City Junction via Kotri–Attock Railway Line
 Attock City Junction–Peshawar Cantonment via Karachi–Peshawar Railway Line

Station stops

Equipment
The train has Economy class accommodations.

References

Named passenger trains of Pakistan
Passenger trains in Pakistan